Kirsty Morrison (born 28 October 1975) is a female British former track and field athlete who competed in the javelin throw.

Athletics career
Her greatest achievement was a bronze medal at the 1998 Commonwealth Games. She won one national title, topping the podium at the 1999 AAA Championships. She also ranked third at the 1993 UK Athletics Championships. She stopped competed after 2012.

Among her first international medals was a silver behind Soviet athlete Tatyana Shlupkina at the 1991 European Youth Olympic Days. She was a silver medallist at the 1993 European Athletics Junior Championships behind Finland's Mikaela Ingberg. She was only the second British woman to reach the javelin podium at that event, after 1979 winner Fatima Whitbread. She entered the World Junior Championships in 1994, but did not make the final there. Her fourth place finish at the 1997 European Athletics U23 Championships was a new high for a British woman at that competition.

Among other domestic competitions, she was the 2001 Inter-Counties Championships champion, four-time winner at the South of England Championships  (1997, 1998, 2002, 2004), 1992 winner for England at the British Schools International Match, six-time winner at the AAA Junior Championships (1989–94), and a five-time winner at the English Schools' Athletics Championships (1990–94).

International competitions

National titles
AAA Championships
Javelin throw: 1999

See also
List of Commonwealth Games medallists in athletics (women)

References

External links

Living people
1975 births
British female javelin throwers
English female javelin throwers
Commonwealth Games medallists in athletics
Commonwealth Games bronze medallists for England
Athletes (track and field) at the 1998 Commonwealth Games
Medallists at the 1998 Commonwealth Games